Shekhinah Thandi Donnell (born 2 October 1994), known mononymously as Shekhinah, is a singer-songwriter from Pietermaritzburg, South Africa. Shekhinah was among the Top 32 of M-Net's Season 7 of SA Idols in 2011 and among the Top 6 of Season 8 of SA Idols in 2012.

Her debut album Rose Gold was released in October 2017 and certified platinum by RiSA on 31 August 2018. Rose Gold produced three number-one singles: "Suited"; "Please Mr." and "Different".

Her second album  Trouble In Paradise, was released  in May 2021.

Career

2016-2018: Rose Gold (2018)
In 2017, Shekinah  released  her lead single "Suited", which peaked   No. 1 on South Africa Music charts and was certified with diamond  plaque  by the Recording industry of South Africa (RiSA).
In 2018, "Please Mr" and "Different"	 was released  same year, "Please Mr" was certified with gold plaque.

On October 6, 2017, her debut studio album Rose Gold was released in South Africa by Sony Music Entertainment Africa.

On 7 May 2021, her second studio album Trouble In Paradise was released in South Africa.

Discography

Singles

Studio albums

Awards and nominations

Metro FM Music Awards

|-
| 2016
|Back to the Beach (Shekhinah & Kyle Deutsch)
|Best Hit Single
|

South African Music Awards

|-
|2016
|Back to the Beach (Shekhinah & Kyle Deutsch)
|Best Collaboration
|
|-
|rowspan="6"|2018
|rowspan="6"|Rose Gold
|Best Pop Album
|
|-
|Best Produced Album
|
|-
|Record of the Year
|
|-
|New Comer of the Year
|
|-
|Album of the Year
|
|-
|Female Artist of the Year
|
|-
|rowspan="2"|2022
|rowspan="2"|Trouble in Paradise
|Best Pop Album 
|
|-
|Female Artist of the Year
|

MTV Africa Music Awards

|-
|2016
|Shekhinah & Kyle Deutsch
|Best Pop & Alternative
|

MTV European Music Awards

|-
|2018
|style="text-align: center;"| Shekhinah
|Best African Act
|

All Africa Music Awards

|-
|rowspan="7"|2018
|rowspan="7"|Rose Gold
|-
|Album of the Year
|
|-
|Best African Dance & Choreography
|
|-
|Best Artiste/Group In African RnB & Soul
|
|-
|Revelation Of The African Continent
|
|-
|Best Female Artist in Southern Africa
|
|-
|Songwriter Of The Year
|
|-
|2021
|"Fixate"
| Best Female Artist in South Africa 
|

KZN Entertainment Awards 

|-
|2020
|style="text-align: center";| Herself 
|Best Female Artist 
|

References

External links 
 

1994 births
Living people
People from KwaZulu-Natal
21st-century South African women singers
South African singer-songwriters
Idols South Africa
People from Msunduzi Local Municipality